Jereldine "Jeri" Redcorn  (born November 23, 1939) is an Oklahoman artist who single-handedly revived traditional Caddo pottery.

Background
Jereldine Redcorn was born on 23 November 1939 at the Indian Hospital in Albuquerque, New Mexico. Her father was Caddo, and her mother was Potawatomi. Redcorn grew up in Colony, Oklahoma, living on the allotment lands of her Caddo grandmother, Francis Elliot. Her tribal name is Bah-ha Nutte, meaning "River Woman." She graduated from Colony High School, then earned a bachelor of science degree from Wayland Baptist University in Plainview, Texas and her master's degree from the Pennsylvania State University in University Park, Pennsylvania.

Revival
In 1991, Redcorn and fellow members of the Caddo Cultural Club visited the Museum of the Red River in Idabel, Oklahoma. There they saw hundreds of precontact Caddo pots, which even the tribal elders were completely unfamiliar with. "That day we were so excited that we decided as a group, as a tribe, we would learn how to do it and make Caddo pottery once again," Redcorn said. Her brother taught her the basics of coiled pottery. With extreme difficulty, she learned burnishing and engraving techniques.

Artwork
In 1991, Redcorn began experimenting and teaching herself how to make pottery using traditional Caddo methods, which involve coiling the clay and incising for decoration. She uses metal or bone tools to incise her pots with ancestral Caddo designs and hand fires them, instead of using a commercial kiln. To add color, she rubs red clay into the incised designs.

Collections
Redcorn's pottery is found in several public collections, including the following:
Bob Bullock Texas State History Museum
Oklahoma History Center
Smithsonian Institution National Museum of the American Indian, George Gustav Heye Center
Smithsonian Institution National Museum of Natural History.

In 2009, First Lady Michelle Obama displayed a pot by Jeri Redcorn, Intertwining Scrolls, in the White House.

Personal life
Redcorn was married to Charles Redcorn, an Osage Nation author. Together, they lived in Norman, Oklahoma until his death in 2017.

Notes

External links
 Redcorn Pottery, official website
 , video of Jeri Redcorn by the National Museum of the American Indian
Oral History Interview with Jereldine Redcorn

Living people
1939 births
Native American potters
Artists from Oklahoma
People from Norman, Oklahoma
People from Washita County, Oklahoma
Caddo
Potawatomi people
Women potters
American women ceramists
American ceramists
21st-century American women
21st-century Native American women
21st-century Native Americans